Chvalová is a village and municipality in Revúca District in the Banská Bystrica Region of Slovakia.

History
In historical records, the village was first mentioned in 1343  when it passed from local Lords Szkárosy to noble Soldosy family. It was destroyed from Turks in the 16th century. From 1938 to 1945 it was annexed by Hungary.

Genealogical resources

The records for genealogical research are available at the state archive "Statny Archiv in Banska Bystrica, Slovakia"

 Roman Catholic church records (births/marriages/deaths): 1756-1896 (parish B)
 Reformated church records (births/marriages/deaths): 1787-1897 (parish B)

See also
 List of municipalities and towns in Slovakia

External links
https://web.archive.org/web/20071217080336/http://www.statistics.sk/mosmis/eng/run.html
http://www.chvalova.gemer.org/
http://www.chvalova.ou.sk/
Surnames of living people in Chvalova

Villages and municipalities in Revúca District